Phassus smithi is a moth of the family Hepialidae first described by Herbert Druce in 1889. It is known from Mexico.

References

Moths described in 1889
Hepialidae